A Laplink Cable, also known as null-printer cable, allows the connection of two computers via the parallel port to establish a direct cable connection.

The cable was introduced in 1983 with the Laplink software package, from Traveling Software, to allow fast data transfer between the early PCs running 
MS-DOS, giving much faster transfer rates than the traditional null modem serial cable. At the time, almost all PCs had a parallel printer port, but neither USB nor modern Ethernet was available.

The INTERSVR program in MS-DOS 6.0 can also use a LapLink cable.

Traveling Software
Traveling Software is now known as Laplink Software, Inc. and their main software is now PCmover. With the demise of parallel ports on PCs Laplink no longer sells the traditional cable. Instead it has USB to hard drive, USB to USB and Ethernet to Ethernet cables.
A Laplink cable can be seen as a parallel equivalent to a serial null modem cable.  Because of the higher bandwidth of the parallel port versus the serial port, a Laplink cable is able to transfer data more quickly.

Wiring

The cable used two DB25 male connectors, and was wired as below:

See also

 Parallel Line Internet Protocol (PLIP)
 Direct cable connection
 Serial console
 Ethernet Cable

References

External links
 Pin descriptions at Nullmodem.Com

Networking hardware
Signal cables
Computer connectors

ru:Параллельный порт#Кабель LapLink